The 1964–65 Copa del Generalísimo was the 63rd staging of the Spanish Cup. The competition began on 15 November 1964 and ended on 4 July 1965 with the final.

First round

|}
Tiebreaker

|}
Second tiebreaker

|}

Round of 32

|}
Tiebreaker

|}
Second tiebreaker

|}

Round of 16

|}

Quarter-finals

|}

Semi-finals

|}

Final

|}

External links
 rsssf.com
 linguasport.com

Copa del Rey seasons
Copa del Rey
Copa